Arkansas Highway 394 (AR 394, Hwy. 394) is the name of two state highways in Independence County, Arkansas.

Southern section
It begins at AR 69 in south Batesville. It runs southeast to Magness, where it terminates at AR 69.

Northern section
It starts again in Batesville from AR 233 and heads north to US 167.

References

External links

394
Transportation in Independence County, Arkansas